Horneby Sand halt is a railway halt serving the western part of the seaside resort town of Hornbæk on the north coast of North Zealand, Denmark.

The halt is located on the Hornbæk Line from Helsingør to Gilleleje. The train services are currently operated by the railway company Lokaltog which runs frequent local train services between Helsingør station and Gilleleje station.

See also
 List of railway stations in Denmark

External links

Lokaltog

Railway stations in the Capital Region of Denmark